Phycopeltis is a genus of green algae in the family Trentepohliaceae.

References

External links

Ulvophyceae genera
Trentepohliaceae